The President of the Chamber of Health and Social Welfare was the presiding officer of the Chamber of Health and Social Welfare of the Federal Assembly of Yugoslavia.

Office-holders
Olga Vrabić 1963 - 1967
Iko Marković 1967 - ?
Ljubiša Popović ? - 1974 ?

Sources
Various editions of The Europa World Year Book

Chamber of Health and Social Welfare, Pres
Yugoslavia, Chamber of Health and Social Welfare